Selysia bidentata is a species of the  genus Selysia native to Panama. It is high similarity to S. smithii. It has ovate seeds and there are 6–9 in each fruit. The fruits turn from green to red at maturity. The leaves have three lobes. Selysia bidentata can be distinguished from the 3 other species of Selysia by its bidentate (two teeth-like parts) seeds. Seeds of the other three species are shaped like arrowheads.

References

External links

Cucurbitoideae